Alberto Vazquez (born August 23, 1955) is a Puerto Rican American actor, screenwriter, teacher, director and producer.

Performances

Film

 Aaron Loves Angela (1975) - Restaurant Patron (uncredited)
 Short Eyes (1977) - Other Inmate
 Saturday Night Fever (1977) - gang member (uncredited)
 Slow Dancing in the Big City (1978)
 Defiance (1980) - Slagg
 White Hot (1988) - Colombian Killer
 Crocodile Dundee II (1988) - Rico's Guard
 Fear, Anxiety & Depression (1989) - Mugger (uncredited)
 Family Business (1989) - Prisoner #1
 Dead Tides (1996) - Rival Gang Member
 T.N.T. (1997) - Carlos
 Wag the Dog (1997) - Combine Driver
 The Legend of 1900 (1998) - Machinista messicano
 Zooman (1998)
 EDtv (1999) - Grave Digger
 Imaginary Heroes (2004) - Manuel - Driver
 From Other Worlds (2004) - Jerry
 The Speed of Life (2007) - Prison Guard
 Michael Clayton (2007) - Player #1
 My Soul to Take (originally called 25/8) (2010) - Officer Ramirez
 W.E. (2011) - Victor
 They Came Together (2014) - Mexican Waiter
 Top Five (2014) - Supermarket Cashier
 The Cobbler (2014) - Bathroom Attendant (uncredited)
 The Plug (2016) - Jaime
 The Stuff (2018) - Marcedo Delgado
 Bel Canto (2018) - Party Guest / Hostage
 Windows on the World (2019) - Hector
 Superheroes
 Power 
 Heroes

TV 
 America's Most Wanted: America Fights Back (1991, documentary) - P. Manriquez
 Law & Order (1991-2004) - Roberto Rosario / Mendez / Block
 Reasonable Doubts (1992) - Martinez
 The Adventures of Brisco County, Jr. (1993) - Soldier
 Walker, Texas Ranger (1994) - Chuchu Sanchez
 High Tide (1996) - Sargent Morales
 Running Mates (2000, TV Movie) - Puerto Rico Delegate
 The Street (2000) - Repairman
 Deadline (2000-2001) - Pablo Corrales
 Ed (2002) - Jorge
 Third Watch (2002) - Manny Velez
 As the World Turns (2002-2003) - Jose / Poker Player #2
 Law & Order: Criminal Intent (2002-2004) - Juan / Nicky Torres
 The Jury (2004) - Navarro Dominguez
 Without a Trace (2004) - Locksmith (uncredited)
 The Sopranos (2006) - Julian
 We Speak NYC (2009) - Fernando
 The Good Wife
 Rosa's Shoes
 SPF-30
 Forensic Files

Broadway
 Cuba and his Teddy Bear.

Off-Broadway
 Street Car Named Desire, First Class, Eulogy for a Small Time Thief, Caucasian Chalk Circle, Leather Heart

References

External links
 Official bio

 Filmreference bio

1955 births
American male actors
Living people
American people of Puerto Rican descent
Puerto Rican male actors
People from East Harlem